Jerome Haywood (born June 7, 1978) is a former Canadian football defensive tackle. He most recently played for the Edmonton Eskimos of the Canadian Football League. He was signed as an undrafted free agent by the Ottawa Renegades in 2002. He played college football at San Diego State.

Haywood was also a member of the Winnipeg Blue Bombers and Montreal Alouettes.

External links
Winnipeg Blue Bombers bio
Montreal Alouettes bio

1978 births
Living people
American players of Canadian football
Canadian football defensive linemen
Edmonton Elks players
Montreal Alouettes players
Ottawa Renegades players
Players of American football from Los Angeles
San Diego State Aztecs football players
Winnipeg Blue Bombers players
Players of Canadian football from Los Angeles